Ushita Station is a HRT station on Astram Line, located in 2-4-44, Ushita-shinmachi, Naka-ku, Hiroshima.

Platforms

Other services connections

Around station
Hiroshima Bigwave
Hiroshima City Higashi Ward Sports Center

History
Opened on August 20, 1994.

See also
Astram Line
Hiroshima Rapid Transit

References 

Ushita Station
Railway stations in Japan opened in 1994